An election for the leadership of the Alberta Liberal Party was held on September 10, 2011, which was caused by David Swann's announcement on February 1, 2011, of his intention to resign as leader. The election is the party's second since the 2008 election. MLA Raj Sherman was elected on the first ballot. An open nomination system was used in which any Albertan could vote in the election, even if they were not party members.

Because of a Progressive Conservative leadership election, the PCs elected a new leader on October 1, 2011. The media were speculating that the new PC leader, who would become Premier, may call a snap election rather than wait until 2013. This did not come to fruition, however, and Alison Redford stated that a general election would be held in the spring.

Timeline
 February 1: David Swann announces his resignation
 May 28–29: Liberal Party General Convention
 August 1: Close of nominations
 September 10: Polling and leadership announcement

Candidates
At the close of nominations, there were five candidates for leader:
 Laurie Blakeman, MLA
 Bill Harvey
 Hugh MacDonald, MLA
 Bruce Payne, a Calgary businessman
 Raj Sherman, MLA

Results

References

2011 elections in Canada
2011
2011 in Alberta
Alberta Liberal Party leadership election